Alder Lake is Intel's codename for the 12th generation of Intel Core processors based on a hybrid architecture utilizing Golden Cove performance cores and Gracemont efficient cores.  It is fabricated using Intel's Intel 7 process, previously referred to as Intel 10 nm Enhanced SuperFin (10ESF). The 10ESF has a 10%-15% boost in performance over the 10SF used in the mobile Tiger Lake processors. Intel officially announced 12th Gen Intel Core CPUs on October 27, 2021. Intel officially announced 12th Gen Intel Core mobile CPUs and non-K series desktop CPUs on January 4, 2022. Intel officially announced the launch of Alder Lake-P and -U series on February 23, 2022, and Alder Lake-HX series on May 10, 2022.

History 
Fabricated using Intel's Intel 7 process, which was previously referred to as Intel 10 nm Enhanced SuperFin (10ESF), Intel officially announced 12th Gen Intel Core CPUs on October 27, 2021. Intel then officially announced 12th Gen Intel Core mobile CPUs and non-K series desktop CPUs on January 4, 2022.

It further was announced in January 2022 that Intel Alder Lake would use a hybrid architecture combining performance and efficiency cores, similar to big.LITTLE which had been created by the semiconductor firm Arm in the United Kingdom. This was the second Intel's hybrid architecture, after the mobile-only Lakefield released in June 2020. While the desktop Alder Lake processors were already on the market by January 2022, the mobile processors were not, although release was expected early that year. Starting cost were USD $289 for the Core i5-12600K. Gracemont was the name given to the efficiency cores, while Golden Cove cores were set for tasks such as gaming and video processing. First laptop tests were performed later that month, with PCMag positively reviewing the Core i9-12900HK, stating the H series represented "Intel's enthusiast line," with "the same hybrid designs" also in the P-series and U-series chips to come out later that year.

In April 2022, press reported on "hints" that Intel was working on Alder Lake-X. Intel officially announced the HX processor series on May 10, 2022, including Core i5, Core i7 and Core i9 models, when Intel announced "seven new mobile processors for the 12th Gen Intel Core mobile family at its Intel Vision event. With the lineup based on Intel's desktop Alder Lake chips, it was named the Alder Lake-HX series, or 12th-gen Core HX, with the Core i9-12950HX as the flagship and Intel's first 16-core chip designed for laptops.

Features

CPU 

 Golden Cove performance cores ("P-cores")
 Dedicated floating-point adders
 New 6-wide instruction decoder (from 4-wide in Rocket Lake/Tiger Lake) with the ability to fetch up to 32 bytes of instructions per cycle (from 16)
 12 execution ports (from 10)
 512 reorder-buffer entries (from 352)
 6-wide μOP allocations (from 5)
 μOP cache size increased to 4K entries (up from 2.25K)
 AVX-VNNI, a VEX-coded variant of AVX512-VNNI for 256-bit vectors
 AVX-512 (including FP16) is present but disabled by default to match E-cores. On early revisions of microprocessors it still can be enabled on some motherboards with some BIOS versions by disabling the E-cores. Intel has physically fused off AVX-512 on later revisions of Alder Lake CPUs manufactured in early 2022 and onward.
 ~18% IPC uplift.
 Gracemont efficient cores ("E-cores")
 Aggregated into 4-core modules with a shared L2 cache
 256 reorder-buffer entries (up from 208 in Tremont)
 17 execution ports (up from 12)
 AVX2, FMA and AVX-VNNI
 Skylake-like IPC.
 New instruction set extensions:
 PTWRITE
 SERIALIZE
 HRESET
 User-mode wait (WAITPKG): TPAUSE, UMONITOR, UMWAIT
 Up to 1 TB/s interconnect between cores 
 Intel Thread Director (only for CPUs with P and E cores), which is a marketing name for Enhanced Hardware Feedback Interface (EHFI). This is a hardware technology to assist the OS thread scheduler with more efficient load distribution between heterogeneous CPU cores. Enabling this new capability requires support in the operating system.
 Architectural last branch records (LBRs)
 Hypervisor-managed linear address translation (HLAT)
 Control-flow enforcement technology (CET), including support for indirect branch tracking (IBT) and shadow stack (SS)
 4–30 MB L3 cache
 Cores:
 up to 8 P-cores and 8 E-cores on desktop
 up to 6 P-cores and 8 E-cores on mobile (UP3 designs)
 up to 2 P-cores and 8 E-cores on ultra mobile (UP4 designs)
 only P-cores feature hyper-threading

GPU 
 Intel Xe (Gen 12.2) GPU
 Up to 96 EU on mobile and 32 EU on desktop

I/O 
 LGA 1700 socket for desktop processors.
 BGA Type3 and Type4 HDI for mobile processors
 20 PCIe lanes from CPU
 16 PCIe 5.0 lanes
 4 PCIe 4.0 lanes
 Chipset link - DMI 4.0 ×8 link with Intel 600 series PCH chipsets
 DDR5, DDR4, LPDDR5, and LPDDR4 memory support
 Up to DDR4-3200
 Up to DDR5-4800
 XMP 3.0
 Dynamic Memory Boost
 Integrated Thunderbolt 4 and WiFi 6E support

Dies 

For the Alder Lake generation, Intel will initially produce 4 different dies. Each die has a different number of P-cores (P) and E-cores (E) and GPU Execution Units.

Software support 
Alder Lake requires special support from the operating system due to its relatively unusual-for-x86 hybrid nature. For software unable to be upgraded, a UEFI-provided compatibility mode may be used to disable the E cores; it is enabled by the user turning on scroll lock.

CPUID incoherence 
The P and E cores of early versions of Alder Lake CPUs reported different CPUID models. This has caused issues with digital rights management systems that perceive the P and E cores as being separate computers, and falsely enforce license restrictions preventing a particular piece of software from being executed on more than one device at a time. Intel published a list of PC games it identified as having this compatibility issue, and stated that it was working with publishers to develop patches. Some of the games were identified by Intel as only having this bug on Windows 10, and functioning correctly on Windows 11 (with some of them dependent on Windows 11 patches scheduled to be released in November 2021). ExamSoft similarly stated that its monitoring software for educational assessments (such as the bar examination) was similarly incompatible with Alder Lake CPUs due to checks detecting virtual machines.

This problem has been fixed in a microcode update. The P and E cores now return the same CPUID when both are enabled. A different CPUID is reported when E cores are disabled and only P cores are enabled. The AVX-512 instruction set extension is implemented in the P cores but disabled due to incompatibility with the E cores. Hackers have shown that it is possible to enable the AVX-512 instructions on the P cores when the E cores are disabled and an old microcode version is used.

There are minor differences between the behavior of the two cores with regard to an undefined overflow flag in certain bitwise operations.

Scheduler support 
Alder Lake's CPU topology has performance implications, especially for gaming environments where the developers are not used to NUMA setups. Microsoft added support for Intel Thread Director (ITD) in Windows 11. A wide variety of inputs, including whether a process' window is in the foreground, feeds into the ITD. The ITD can function to a lesser extent with the OS providing less or no cooperation. Support in Linux is merged in kernel 5.18 but this alone is not sufficient until the kernel gets hints from userspace in order to schedule tasks to run on certain types of cores.

Blu-Ray DRM support 
The CPU family no longer features Intel SGX which is a requirement for playing UltraHD Blu-Ray discs.

List of 12th generation Alder Lake processors

Desktop processors (Alder Lake-S) 
 All the CPUs support up to 128 GB of DDR4-3200 or DDR5-4800 RAM in dual channel mode and up to 192 GB of DDR5 on selected MSI and ASUS motherboards.
 All the CPUs support 16x PCI Express Gen 5 and 4x PCI Express Gen 4 lanes, but support may vary depending on motherboard and chipsets.
 Models without the F suffix feature either of the following integrated UHD Graphics GPUs, all with base frequency of 300 MHz:
 UHD Graphics 770 with 32 EUs,
 UHD Graphics 730 with 24 EUs,
 UHD Graphics 710 with 16 EUs.
 By default, Alder Lake CPUs are configured to run at Turbo Power at all times and Base Power is only guaranteed when P-Cores/E-cores do not exceed the base clock rate.
 Max Turbo Power: the maximum sustained (> 1 s) power dissipation of the processor as limited by current and/or temperature controls. Instantaneous power may exceed Maximum Turbo Power for short durations (≤ 10 ms). Maximum Turbo Power is configurable by system vendor and can be system specific.
 CPUs in bold below feature ECC memory support only when paired with a motherboard based on the W680 chipset.

 By default, Core i9-12900KS achieves 5.5 GHz only when using Thermal Velocity Boost.

Mobile processors

Alder Lake-HX 
 CPUs in bold below feature ECC memory support only when paired with a motherboard based on the WM690 chipset.

Alder Lake-H

Alder Lake-P

Alder Lake-U

Alder Lake-N 
These CPUs feature only E-cores and have 6MB of Smart Cache.

Processors for Internet of Things (IoT) devices and embedded systems (Alder Lake-PS) 
Most of these processors are identical to the corresponding Alder Lake-H and Alder Lake-U processors (without the L suffix) listed above.

High-power 
These CPUs feature 35 W minimum assured, 45 W base and 65 W maximum assured power consumption.

Low-power 
These CPUs feature 12 W minimum assured, 15 W base and 28 W maximum assured power consumption.

See also 
 Intel Core
 Intel Lakefield
 Sapphire Rapids, Intel's 4th generation Xeon server processors based on Golden Cove microarchitecture and Intel 7 process
 List of Intel CPU microarchitectures

References 

Intel x86 microprocessors
X86 microarchitectures